"Always" is a song by Azerbaijani singer Aysel Teymurzadeh (performing as Aysel) and Swedish-Iranian singersongwriter Arash Labaf (performing mononymously). It was the  entry to the Eurovision Song Contest 2009. The song was selected by Ictimai TV (İTV), the Azerbaijani broadcaster, among the 30 songs submitted to the broadcaster in an open call. The song was composed by a group of songwriters including Arash.

The video clip for the song was directed by Swedish director  and premiered on Ictimai TV on 24 April 2009. Boklund described the video as "visual rendition of the performers' emotions and feelings." It notably featured tar, a traditional Azeri musical instrument. Likewise the instrument briefly appeared on stage in Arash's hands during the live performance of "Always" at Eurovision.

AySel & Arash performed 12th in the second Eurovision semi-final on 14 May, following 's Zoli Ádok with "Dance with Me" and preceding 's Sakis Rouvas with "This Is Our Night". The duo received 180 points, placing second behind 's Alexander Rybak, and proceeding to the final.

At the final the duo performed 11th in the draw, following 's Anastasiya Prikhodko with "Mamo" and preceding 's Regina with "Bistra voda". They received 207 points, placing 3rd behind Norway's Alexander Rybak and 's Yohanna. This was Azerbaijan's first top 3 placing.

By 2022, the official video for "Always" had been played on YouTube over 40 million times, while the live performance in the Eurovision final has 19 million views.

In January 2010, Tophit.ru reported that "Always" had become the second most selling ringtone in Ukraine and Belarus.

Charts

Weekly

Year-end

Track listing
Turkish – Digital single

 "Always" (Single Version) – 3:03
 "Always" (Ali Payami Remix) – 4:09

References

External links
Always (videoclip). Youtube.com.
AySel & Arash official website
BBC. Eurovision. Azerbaijan.
Eurovision.tv. AySel & Arash – Always – Azerbaijan 2009

Eurovision songs of 2009
Eurovision songs of Azerbaijan
English-language Azerbaijani songs
Azerbaijani songs
Arash (singer) songs
Songs written by Alex P
Song recordings produced by Alex P
Songs written by Marcus Englof
Songs written by Wrethov
Songs written by Robert Uhlmann (composer)
2009 songs
Warner Music Group singles
Music videos directed by Fredrik Boklund
Songs written by Arash (singer)